The Triton 30 is a Canadian an American trailerable sailboat that was designed by Doug Peterson as a racer-cruiser and first built in 1985.

The design is a unauthorized development of Peterson's International Offshore Rule Half Ton class Chaser 29 racer, using the same hull design. The molds had been owned by US Yachts, a division of Bayliner to make the US Yachts US 29 and were sold to Pearson Yachts.

Production
The design was built by Pearson Yachts in the United States, starting in 1985, but it is now out of production.

Design
The Triton 30 is a recreational keelboat, built predominantly of fiberglass, with wood trim. It has a masthead sloop rig, a raked stem, a reverse transom, an internally mounted spade-type rudder controlled by a wheel and a fixed fin keel. It displaces  and carries  of ballast.

See also
List of sailing boat types

References

Keelboats
1980s sailboat type designs
Sailing yachts
Sailboat type designs by Doug Peterson
Sailboat types built by Pearson Yachts